Virginia Wade defeated Betty Stöve in the final, 4–6, 6–3, 6–1 to win the ladies' singles tennis title at the 1977 Wimbledon Championships. As of 2022, she remains the most recent British female to win the title. She was the last Briton to win a Wimbledon singles title until Andy Murray won in 2013, and was the last British female to win any grand slam singles title until Emma Raducanu won the 2021 US Open.

Chris Evert was the defending champion, but she lost in the semifinals to Wade.

This was the first time Wimbledon seeded more than eight players for the ladies' championship, increasing the number to twelve players; the number was further increased to 16 the following year.

Seeds

  Chris Evert (semifinals)
  Martina Navratilova (quarterfinals)
  Virginia Wade (champion)
  Sue Barker (semifinals)
  Billie Jean King (quarterfinals)
  Rosie Casals (quarterfinals)
  Betty Stöve (final)
  Kerry Melville (quarterfinals)
  Dianne Fromholtz (withdrew)
  Mima Jaušovec (third round)
  Françoise Dürr (third round)
  Kathy May (fourth round)

Dianne Fromholtz withdrew due to illness. She was replaced in the draw by lucky loser Chris O'Neil.

Qualifying

Draw

Finals

Top half

Section 1

Section 2

Section 3

Section 4

Bottom half

Section 5

Section 6

Section 7

Section 8

References

External links

1977 Wimbledon Championships – Women's draws and results at the International Tennis Federation

Women's Singles
Wimbledon Championship by year – Women's singles
Wimbledon Championships
Wimbledon Championships